Emily Webley-Smith (born 14 July 1984) is a British professional tennis player.

She has a career-high WTA singles ranking of No. 240, achieved on 7 November 2011. She also has a best WTA doubles ranking of No. 113, set on 2 November 2015. Webley-Smith has won four singles titles and 26 doubles titles on the ITF Circuit. She has also reached the second round of her home Grand Slam, Wimbledon, on one occasion in 2004.

Personal life
Emily Webley-Smith was born in 1984 in Thornbury, Avon, which is now in South Gloucestershire. Her mother, Jane, is a PE teacher and her father, Mike, an amateur footballer and cricketer. She also has a sister named Hannah. Her first introduction to tennis was playing swingball in her garden and in the cricket grounds where her father was the club captain. She is coached by Jeremy Bates.

Webley-Smith plays right-handed with a two-handed backhand. Her favorite surface is grass.

In her spare time of late, she plays on the touchtennis tour against amateurs and other professional tennis players for fun. Her highest ranking was No. 2 in 2011.

Injury problems
Problems with Webley-Smith's right ankle began in 2002 when she broke it whilst on court competing in the qualifying tournament for the $25k ITF Circuit event in Cardiff and underwent surgery to repair both the bone and the damage caused to the ligaments. She was unable to compete on the tour for six months.

In November 2003, she needed a second operation on her ankle to remove cartilage which had come loose; an operation which was successful and enabled Emily to play injury-free tennis for almost two years.

However, she had to take yet more time out later in 2005 when she began experiencing sharp pains in the same ankle while warming up for an ITF tournament in Puebla, Mexico. She had treatment on the ankle again and returned, with limited success, to competitive tennis in spring 2006 before having surgery for a third time to remove fluid from her ankle.

She began recovering well before septicaemia left her unable to walk for five weeks. Webley-Smith said of the time, "My ankle was the size of a football. I remember the doctor trying to take my sock off and I was screaming. I was taking what they call an 'elephant dose' of antibiotics and the strongest painkillers they could give me". She returned full-time to the circuit in August 2006.

In 2009, she also began to have trouble with her wrist after injuring it during an ITF event in Tanjung Selor in Indonesia, just a number of weeks before Wimbledon. It recovered well enough in time for Webley-Smith to compete in the Wimbledon qualifying rounds however she reaggravated the injury later in the year and was unable to compete again until February 2010.

Career

Junior (1998–2002)
Webley-Smith played her first junior ITF tournament in February 1998 and her last in July 2002. Over her junior career in singles, she reached a total of four quarterfinals, two semifinals and the final of the "Slazenger Appletise Winchester Junior Tournament". She competed at Wimbledon juniors a total of four times; in 1999, 2000 and 2001 she lost in the qualifying stages but in 2002 she reached the second round of the main draw. Her career-high singles ranking was world No. 119 (reached on 29 April 2002) and her win–loss record was 31–31.

In doubles, she won three tournaments, was a runner-up in another and also reached one semifinal and seven quarterfinals. Her doubles win–loss record was 22–27 and her career-high ranking was world No. 95 (achieved on 30 July 2001).

1999–2002
Webley-Smith played her first match on the ITF Women's Circuit in October 1999, a match which she lost 0–6, 0–6 against Melanie Schnell from Austria. It was her only professional match in 1999.

In 2000, she played a total of six tournaments. She lost in the qualifying rounds of four $10k events in Great Britain (Bournemouth, Frinton, Hatfield and Sunderland), lost in the first round of another (in Glasgow) and was also beaten in the first round of the $25k event in Felixstowe by fellow Brit Jane O'Donoghue, 4–6, 3–6.

The 2001 season began well for Webley-Smith as in her very first tournament of the year she qualified and reached the quarterfinals of the $10k event in Jersey before being beaten by Anne Keothavong, 6–3, 7–6. But she was unable to show this form for the rest of the year, losing in the qualifying stages in every other tournament she entered with the exception of the $10k Sunderland event where she was defeated again by Keothavong, 6–3, 6–4. She also played in the main draw of her final ITF tournament of the year as a lucky loser but was again beaten in round one. She ended the year ranked 712.

Webley-Smith had a varied year in 2002, with limited success on the ITF Circuit but also her first appearance in a Grand Slam tournament at Wimbledon where she lost in the first round of qualifying to Nina Dübbers, 1–6, 2–6. She only reached one quarterfinal in 2002, at the $10k London event in August. In October, Emily broke her ankle during a qualifying match for a $25k event in Cardiff and did not compete again that season. Nevertheless, her year-end world ranking rose to world No. 673.

2003
Webley-Smith played her first professional match since breaking her ankle in 2002 in April at the qualifying event for the $10k tournament in Bournemouth where she lost in the second round. In May, she reached two consecutive quarterfinals of $10k events in Spain: Monzón and Almeira. In June, for the first time in her career, she was given a wildcard into the DFS Classic qualifying draw, a Tier-III tournament in Birmingham where she was beaten by Bethanie Mattek in straight sets, 6–3, 6–4. She then received another wildcard into Wimbledon qualifying and again lost her first round match, 2–6, 1–6, to Sada Noorlander. Two more consecutive quarterfinal appearances in ITF tournaments immediately followed this, Waco, Texas ($10k) and Vancouver ($25k), and one more in August in a $10k event in London. She ended the year with a singles ranking of world No. 469.

2004
2004 started slowly for Webley-Smith; she won only two of her first ten matches on the ITF Circuit. However, in March she reached the quarterfinals of the $10k tournament in Patras before losing to Ekaterina Dzehalevich, 2–6, 0–6. In this same tournament, she reached the doubles final partnering compatriot, Chantal Coombs, and lost to Martina Müller and Vladimíra Uhlířová, 6–7, 3–6. Two months later, she reached two more ITF quarterfinals consecutively in Mérida, Yucatán and Surbiton. In June, she was given wildcards into the qualifying draws for the Tier-III Birmingham Classic and the Eastbourne International (Tier II), where she lost in the first and second rounds of qualifying, respectively.

This was immediately followed by another wildcard, this one into the main draw of Wimbledon. In her first ever main-draw Grand Slam appearance, she managed to survive rain delays and defeat Frenchwoman Séverine Beltrame, in straight sets, to reach the second round where she faced 31st seed Amy Frazier. The final result did not go Webley-Smith's way though as she was defeated with a final score of 6–2, 3–6, 8–6. She spent the rest of the year on the ITF Circuit but did not progress past the second round in any tournament she played. Her year-end ranking for 2004 was 272.

2005
Webley-Smith began the 2005 season well on home ground by reaching the semifinals of the $10k tournament in Tipton where she had to retire during her semifinal match against fellow Briton, Katie O'Brien. She continued competing on the ITF Circuit for the first half of the year and reached the quarterfinal stages in two more $10k tournaments, in Tampico, Tamaulipas and Ho Chi Minh City. In June, she was given a wildcard into the qualifying draw for the Tier III tournament, the DFS Classic where she lost in the first round of the qualifying event. This was followed by a wildcard into the qualifying draw of Wimbledon where she was also beaten in the first round, by Meilen Tu, 7–5, 6–3. She reached only one more ITF semifinal that year, in the $25k event in Lagos where she lost, 2–6, 4–6, to Anne Keothavong. Her year-end ranking for 2005 was world No. 385.

2006
She spent much of the 2006 season out of action due to suffering from septicaemia as a result of her long-term ankle problems which began in 2002. She was forced to retire in only her second match of the year in February and was unable to compete again until August when she reached the semifinals of an ITF tournament in London and the quarterfinals a tournament in Istanbul. She was beaten by compatriot Naomi Cavaday in either the first or second round in three out of four consecutive $25k tournaments in September, October and November that year. As a result of her injury problems, Webley-Smith's final ranking of the year fell to No. 713.

2007
She spent the first three months competing in lower ITF tournaments. In April, Webley-Smith was a semifinalist in Obregón in Mexico and in May she reached two quarterfinals in Mazatlán and Irapuato, both also in Mexico. She was awarded a wildcard into the qualifying draw of Wimbledon where she lost in the first round, 2–6, 3–6, to Jenifer Widjaja. She reached only one more quarterfinal that year, in Wrexham. Her year-end ranking was world No. 595.

2008
The circuit started slowly for Webley-Smith as she began the season with four consecutive losses. However, in July she reached the quarterfinals of an ITF event in Atlanta and then immediately went on to reach two consecutive finals in Evansville, Indiana and Saint Joseph, Missouri. In late September and early October, she reached two more $25k quarterfinals and just a few weeks later she reached two consecutive ITF semifinals: in Port Pirie ($25k) where she was beaten by Melanie South, 6–1, 6–4, and in Muzaffarnagar where she lost to Sanaa Bhambri, 0–6, 0–6. She reached the quarterfinals of the $50k event in Kolkata in November and finished the season ranked world No. 475.

2009
In February 2009, Webley-Smith returned to the ITF Circuit and in March she won the first singles title of her career in Spain by beating Elena Chalova in the final, 6–0, 7–6. She then headed to Indonesia for a series of three tournaments but in the third of these she injured her wrist and was forced to retire in round one. Returning to the tour in mid-June, Webley-Smith was given a wildcard into the qualifying tournament at Eastbourne where she lost 0–6, 6–7 to María José Martínez Sánchez. A second consecutive wildcard allowed her entry into qualifying for Wimbledon, where she lost in the first round to Gréta Arn. In August, she reached two ITF tournament finals, winning the first to give her the second title of her career and losing the other. Webley-Smith spent the rest of the season competing in Australia and reached two $25k quarterfinals before reinjuring her wrist in November. Her year-end ranking was 332.

2011
In the spring, Webley-Smith made her first $50k singles final in Gifu, Japan, where she finished runner-up to Sachie Ishizu.

ITF Circuit finals

Singles: 12 (4 titles, 8 runner–ups)

Doubles: 54 (26 titles, 28 runner–ups)

Grand Slam singles performance timeline

References

External links

 
 
 LTA Profile

1984 births
Living people
British female tennis players
People from Thornbury, Gloucestershire
Tennis people from Gloucestershire
English female tennis players
People educated at The Red Maids' School